The following is a list of ancient Colchian tribes.

Background

This is a list of the ancient Colchian tribes.

List of ancient Colchian tribes

References

External links
Iberiana - Georgian Tribes

Ancient peoples of Georgia (country)
Tribes in Greco-Roman historiography